The 2017–18 season was Al Ain Football Club's 44rd in existence and the club's 42st consecutive season in the top-level football league in the UAE.

Club

Technical staff
{| class="wikitable"
|-
! style="color:#FFFFFF; background: #7300E6; border:2px solid #AB9767;"|Position
! style="color:#FFFFFF; background: #7300E6; border:2px solid #AB9767;"|Name
|-
|Head coach
| Zoran Mamić
|-
|Assistant coach
| Damir Krznar Dean Klafurić
|-
|Technical analyst	
| Vedran Attias
|-
|Fitness coach
| Ivan Štefanić
|-
|Goalkeeping coach	
| Miralem Ibrahimović
|-
|Club doctor	
| Jurica Rakic
|-
|Physiotherapist	
| Ivica Orsolic Marin Polonijo  Bozo Sinkovic  Abdul Nasser Al Juhani
|-
|Nutritionist
| Mohsen Belhoz
|-
|U-21 team head coach
| Joško Španjić
|-
|Team Manager
| Matar Obaid Al Sahbani
|-
|Team Supervisor
| Mohammed Obeid Hammad
|-
|Team Administrator	
| Essam Abdulla
|-
|Director of football
| Sultan Rashed

Board of directors

Disciplinary record

|-

Hat-tricks

4 – Player scored four goals.

Goalscorers

Includes all competitive matches. The list is sorted alphabetically by surname when total goals are equal.

Assists

Clean sheets

References

External links
 Al Ain FC official website 

2017–18
Emirati football clubs 2017–18 seasons